Vijay Singh Pathik (born  Bhoop Singh; 1882–1954), popularly known as Rashtriya Pathik, was an Indian revolutionary.  He was among the first Indian revolutionaries who lit the torch of freedom movement against British rule. Much before Mohandas K. Gandhi initiated the Satyagrah movement, Pathik experimented during the Bijolia’s Kisan agitation. After being implicated in the Lahore conspiracy case in 1915, he changed his name to Vijay Singh Pathik. His grandfather's sacrifice in the struggle of 1857 in Bulandshahr district, affected him deeply to be freedom fighter.

Early life
Pathik was born in 1882 in Guthawali village, Bulandshahar district to Hamir Singh and Kamal Kunwari in a Hindu Gurjar family. His father had taken active part in the Sepoy Mutiny of 1857 and was arrested multiple times. Pathik's Grand Father was Inder Singh, who was Dewan of Malagarh Riyasat and was killed while fighting against the British. While, his birth name was Bhoop Singh, but he changed it to "Vijay Singh Pathik" after being implicated in the Lahore Conspiracy Case in 1915.

Bijoliya Kisaan Andolan
He joined revolutionary organisation in his teenage and took active part against British rule in India. Pathikji’s non-cooperation movement was so successful that Lokmanya Tilak wrote a letter to Maharana Fateh Singh to meet the demand of the Bijoliya agitators. Mahatma Gandhi sent his secretary Mahadev Desai to study the movement. It was Pathik who fought for the cause of united Rajasthan and had taken up the issue with Prime Minister Jawaharlal Nehru and Sardar Patel. He was jailed for having led the Kisan agitation in Bijoliya and kept at special jail created in the Tehsil building of Todgarh. The Kisan Panchayat, Mahila Mandal and Yuvak Mandal invited Pathik to come and lead them. Women of Mewar started to get respect from their men folk. Pathik made people feel that gender equality is necessary to develop a prosperous society.

Pathik was a great patriot and freedom fighter. As author Indira Vyas said, "He would prefer to end his life rather than to bow down the flag. He also wrote the famous flag song which was very popular during that period."

Writer and poet
Being Indian Revolutionary  and Satyagrahi, he was also a very well known Hindi poet, writer and journalist. He was the editor of Rajasthan Kesari and Naveen Rajasthan. He also started his own independent Hindi weekly, the Rajasthan Sandesh and the Nav Sandesh from Ajmer.

He expressed his views through Tarun Rajasthan, Hindi weekly too. He popularly had known as Rashtriya Pathik.

As writer also he made impact through some of his well-known books -Ajay Meru ( novel), Pathik Pramod (collection of stories), Pathikji ke Jail ke Patra, Pathik ki Kavitaon Ka Sangrah etc.  He was also appointed as the President of the Rajputana and Madhya Bharat Provincial Congress.
Mahatma Gandhi said about him that Pathik is a worker, others are talkers. Pathik is a soldier, brave and impetuous...

Death and legacy
Pathik died in Mathura in 1954, when Rajasthan state was formed. 

The Government of India issued a postage stamp to pay tribute to him. The Vijay Singh Pathik Smriti Sansthan chronicles the contributions of Vijay Singh Pathik.

References

Further reading
MuseIndia on Pathik

External links
Vijay Singh Pathik
book telling about Pathik Ji

Indian independence activists from Uttar Pradesh
Indian revolutionaries
20th-century Indian poets
Poets from Uttar Pradesh
1954 deaths
1882 births
People from Bulandshahr district
Journalists from Uttar Pradesh
20th-century Indian journalists